Salvesen is a surname. Notable people with the surname include: 

Alastair Salvesen (born 1941), British billionaire businessman
Anton Salvesen, Norwegian luger who competed in the 1950s
Edward Theodore Salvesen (1857–1942), Scottish lawyer, politician and judge
Guy Salvesen, South African-born biochemist, best known for his work in the field of apoptosis
Harald Salvesen (1889–1972), Norwegian medical doctor and internist, professor at Rikshospitalet in Oslo
Harold Salvesen (1897–1970), British businessman
Henry Adolph Salvesen (1860–1924), Scottish mechanical engineer and naval architect
Jens Salvesen (1883–1976), Norwegian sailor who competed in the 1920 Summer Olympics
Kjartan Salvesen (born 1976), winner of the second season of Norwegian version of Idol
Salve Andreas Salvesen (1909–1975), Norwegian politician for the Labour Party
Sylvia Salvesen (1890–1973), World War II resistance member
Theodore Salvesen (1863–1942), Scottish soldier, businessman, and owner of Christian Salvesen

See also
Chr. Salvesen & Chr. Thams's Communications Aktieselskab, Norwegian electricity production and railway operation company
Christian Salvesen, European transport and logistics company
Salvesen Cove, cove forming the south extremity of Hughes Bay, along the west coast of Graham Land
Salvesen Range, mountain range on the southern tip of South Georgia
Salveson (surname)